Alfa Papa Tango was a 1990 - 1991 Belgian romantic TV drama series directed by Vincent Rouffaer, written by Guy Bernaert and Mark De Bie. The music was composed by Brian Clifton.

Cast
Nolle Versyp - Walter Halleux
Machteld Ramoudt - Tiene De Vijlder
Jo De Meyere - Maurice Haegeman
Sjarel Branckaerts - Albert Goossens
Jaak Van Assche - Marcel Van Oppen
Walter Cornelis - Roger Buelens
Johan Van Lierde - Fred Boenders
Ludo Busschots - Koen Pauwels
Ben Van Ostade - Ronnie Abbeloos
Geert Vermeulen - Wim Van Der Straeten
and Heddie Suls, Doris Van Caneghem, Marijke Hofkens, Jeannine Schevernels, Diane De Ghouy...

External links

References

Flemish television shows
Belgian drama television shows
1991 Belgian television series endings
1990 Belgian television series debuts
1990s Belgian television series
Eén original programming